Jagga is a 1964 Indian Punjabi-language film, directed by Jugal Kishore, starring Dara Singh, Indira, Khairati, Amarnath, Jugal Kishore, Majnu, and more. It is based on the story of 20th-century dacoit Jagga Jatt Movie won the National Film Awards in 1964.

Music
Lyrics by M.S.Sehrai an songs sang by Mohammad Rafi, Shamshad Begum, Minoo Purshottam, S.Balbir

(1) Mera Baanka Desh- ਮੇਰਾ ਬਾਂਕਾ ਦੇਸ਼

(2) Jeh Main Jaandi | ਜੇਹ ਮੈਂ ਜਾਂਦੀ

(3) Jeh Main Jaandi | ਜੇਹ ਮੈਂ ਜਾਂਦੀ

References

External links 

1964 films
Punjabi-language Indian films
1960s Punjabi-language films
Films based on Indian folklore
Films set in Punjab, India
Indian black-and-white films
Indian films based on actual events